The Sezibwa River is a river in Central Uganda, in East Africa. The name is derived from the Luganda phrase "sizibwa kkubo", which translates into "my path cannot be blocked".

Location
River Sezibwa is located in the southern central part of Uganda. It starts from the wetlands between Lake Victoria and Lake Kyoga, west of the Victoria Nile and flows in a general northerly direction to empty into Lake Kyoga. The source of River Sezibwa is located in Buikwe District, near the town of Ngogwe, with coordinates: Latitude:0.2700; Longitude:33.0050. River Sezibwa enters Lake Kyoga in Kayunga District, near the town of Galilaya, with coordinates: Latitude:1.3700; Longitude:32.8150.
 Between its source in Buikwe District, but before it enters Kayunga District, the river flows through Mukono District.

Legend 
According to legend, the Ssezibwa River is not a natural phenomenon, but the progeny of a pregnant woman called Nakangu, who lived many hundreds of years ago and belonged to the Achibe (ox) clan. she was expected to give birth to twins, but instead what poured from her womb was a twin river, one that split into two distinct streams around an island immediately below the waterfall. The spirits of Nakangu's unborn children - Ssezibwa and Mobeya - each inhabit one of these streams, for which reason it used to be customary for any Muganda passing the river's source at Namukono, some 20km further east, to throw a handful of grass or stones into the river for good luck. Even today, a thanksgiving sacrifice of barkcloth, beer and a cockerel is made at the river's source every year, usually led by a Ssalongo (father of twins).

Sezibwa Falls
The site is a Buganda Heritage Site. It is marked with an out-span of sharp-edged rocks and the magnificent sound of soothing waters flowing down the steep ridged stones. The Falls are located in Mukono District.

According to traditional legend, the two rivers named Sezibwa and its brother Bwanda, were born by a woman on her way to Kavuma Bukunja. The woman, Nakkungu Tebatuusa, whose husband was called Nsubuga Sebwaato, gave birth to twins in form of water, whereupon Sezibwa flowed west, passing many obstacles and deriving its name, while Bwanda flowed east, toward Nyenga. Many people come to the place for miracles as they believe the site has supernatural powers. 

Rock climbing and bird watching are the main activities at the site. Geologists and other scientists also frequent the site. Wildlife in the surrounding forest includes bush monkeys, red-tailed monkeys and other primates and birds.

See also
Lake Victoria
Lake Kyoga
Victoria Nile
Kayunga

References

External links
Detailed Description of Sezibwa Falls
Rivers and Lakes of Uganda
 Photo of Sezibwa Falls

Rivers of Uganda
Buganda
Mukono District
Kayunga District